Marma is a genus of South American jumping spiders that was first described by Eugène Louis Simon in 1902.

Species 
, it contains twelve species found in South America:

 Marma abaira Salgado & Ruiz, 2020 - Brazil
 Marma argentina (Mello-Leitão, 1941) - Argentina
 Marma baeri Simon, 1902 - Ecuador
 Marma femella (Caporiacco, 1955) - Venezuela
 Marma linae Salgado & Ruiz, 2020 - Brazil
 Marma nigritarsis (Simon, 1900) - Colombia, Venezuela, Guyana, French Guiana, Brazil, Paraguay, Argentina
 Marma pechichon Cala-Riquelme & Salgado, 2021 - Colombia
 Marma pipa Salgado & Ruiz, 2020 - Brazil
 Marma rosea (Mello-Leitão, 1941) - Brazil, Argentina
 Marma sinuosa Salgado & Ruiz, 2020 - Brazil
 Marma spelunca Salgado & Ruiz, 2020 - Brazil
 Marma wesolowskae Salgado & Ruiz, 2020 - Brazil

References

Salticidae genera
Salticidae
Spiders of South America